Ctenosculidae is a family of crustaceans belonging to the order Dendrogastrida.

Genera:
 Ctenosculum Heath, 1910
 Endaster Grygier, 1985
 Gongylophysema Grygier, 1987

References

Maxillopoda
Crustacean families